Ruff, Rugged & Raw, is the second and final studio album by Double X Posse, released on May 30, 1995 by Atlantic Records. It is the follow up to their debut album Put Ya Boots On. A single and music video (directed by Hype Williams) for the track "Money Talks" was released to promote the album.

Track listing
 Ruff, Rugged & Raw - 3:43
 Wreckin' It - 4:47
 Money Talks - 3:35
 Stop That Playin' - 5:04
 He Asked For It - 3:40
 Wicked & Wild - 4:24
 Make Some Noise - 4:26
 Ghetto Life - 3:57
 Knock It Off Will Ya' - 4:02
 F.F.F.F. - 4:13
 Sunshine - 4:37
 8 Bars of Terror - 5:50

References

External links
 

1995 albums
Double X Posse albums
Atlantic Records albums
Albums produced by Lord Finesse